Uroptychus orientalis is a species of chirostylid squat lobster first found in Taiwan. This species is separated from U. occidentalis by its shorter antennal scale and dactyli P2–4 with their ultimate and penultimate spines being subequal in size.

References

Further reading
Baba, Keiji, et al. "Eumunida Smith, 1883."
Macpherson, Enrique, and Keiji Baba. "2 Taxonomy of squat lobsters." The Biology of Squat Lobsters 20 (2011): 39.
Baeza, J. Antonio. "8 Squat lobsters as symbionts and in chemo-autotrophic environments." The Biology of Squat Lobsters 20 (2011): 249.
Tsang, Ling Ming, et al. "Hermit to king, or hermit to all: multiple transitions to crab-like forms from hermit crab ancestors." Systematic biology 60.5 (2011): 616–629.

External links

WORMS

Squat lobsters
Crustaceans described in 2008